Wielgolas  is a village in the administrative district of Gmina Latowicz, within Mińsk County, Masovian Voivodeship, in east-central Poland.

The village has a population of 650.

References

Villages in Mińsk County